Glover is an unincorporated community in the town of Troy, St. Croix County, Wisconsin, United States.

History
The community was named for J. E. Glover, a lumberman.

Notes

Unincorporated communities in St. Croix County, Wisconsin
Unincorporated communities in Wisconsin